Lawson Macgregor Roll (born 8 March 1965) is a former English cricketer.  Roll was a right-handed batsman who bowled right-arm off break. He was born in Thornbury, Gloucestershire.

Roll made his only first-class appearance for Gloucestershire against the touring Sri Lankans in 1984.  In this match he wasn't required to bat and with the ball he bowled 15 wicket-less overs.  He later played 2 MCCA Knockout Trophy matches for the Gloucestershire Cricket Board, against Wiltshire in 1999 and Herefordshire in 2000.

His grandfather, Henry Roll, played a first-class match for Warwickshire in 1927.

References

External links
Lawson Roll at ESPNcricinfo
Lawson Roll at CricketArchive

1965 births
Living people
English people of Scottish descent
People from Thornbury, Gloucestershire
English cricketers
Gloucestershire cricketers
Gloucestershire Cricket Board cricketers
Sportspeople from Gloucestershire